Magnus Abelvik Rød (born 7 July 1997) is a Norwegian handball player for SG Flensburg-Handewitt and the Norwegian national team.

He participated at the 2019 World Men's Handball Championship and at the 2020 Summer Olympics. Rød missed almost the entire 2021-22 season through injury.

Honours
 Handball-Bundesliga:
 : 2018, 2019
 DHB-Supercup:
 : 2019

Individual awards
 Handball-planet: Young World Handball Player of the Year: 2019

References

External links
 
 
 Magnus Abelvik Rød at the Norwegian Handball Federation 
 
 
 

1997 births
Living people
Norwegian male handball players
Handball players from Oslo
Expatriate handball players
Norwegian expatriate sportspeople in Germany
Handball-Bundesliga players
SG Flensburg-Handewitt players
Handball players at the 2014 Summer Youth Olympics
Handball players at the 2020 Summer Olympics
Olympic handball players of Norway